Calmegin, also known as CLGN, is a protein which in humans is encoded by the CLGN gene. Calmegin is also present in other animals including mice.

Function 
Calmegin is a testis-specific endoplasmic reticulum chaperone protein.  CLGN may play a role in spermatogeneisis and infertility.

References

Further reading